Charles Le Gobien (1653 – 5 March 1708) was a French Jesuit writer, founder of the Lettres édifiantes et curieuses a collection of reports from Jesuit missionaries in China. It is a major source of information for the history of Catholic missions and life in China in those times.

Life
Le Gobien was born at Saint-Malo, Brittany.  He entered the Society of Jesus on 25 November 1671. As professor of philosophy and especially while procurator of the Franco-Chinese mission, he sought in a series of papers to awaken interest in the work of Christianizing Eastern Asia.  He died at Paris.

Works

In 1697 appeared at Paris his "Lettres sur les progréz de la religion à la Chine". Apropos of Chinese Rites controversy, he published among other things "Histoire de l'édit de l'empereur de la Chine en faveur de la religion chrétienne avec un éclaircissement sur les honneurs que les Chinois rendent à Confucius et aux morts" (Paris, 1698); and in the year 1700: "Lettre à un Docteur de la Faculté de Paris sur les propositions déférées en Sorbonne par M. Prioux". Under the same date there appeared in Paris the "Histoire des Isles Mariannes nouvellement converties à la religion chrétienne". The second part, translated into Spanish by J. Delgado, is found in the latter's "Historia General de Filipinas" (Manila, 1892).

In 1702 Père Le Gobien published "Lettres de quelques missionnaires de la Compagnie de Jésus, écrites de la Chine et des Indes Orientales"; this was the beginning of the collection soon to become celebrated under the title of "Lettres édifiantes et curieuses écrites des missions étrangéres par quelques missionnaires de la Compagnie de Jésus". The first eight series were by Le Gobien, the latter ones by Fathers Du Halde, Patouillet, Geoffroy, and Maréchal. The collection was printed in thirty-six vols. duodecimo (Paris, 1703–76), and reissued in 1780-81 by Fathers Yves, de Querbeux, and Brotier in twenty-six vols. duodecimo, omitting the prefaces. New editions appeared in 1819, 1829–32, and 1838–43. One abridgment in four vols. octavo, was entitled "Panthéon Littéraire", by L. Aimé Martin (1834–43). A partial English translation came out in London in 1714.

The publication incited the Austrian Jesuit Stöcklein to undertake his "Neuer Welt Bott" (about 1720), at first considered merely a translation, but soon an independent and particularly valuable collection (five vols., folio in forty parts) substantially completing the "Lettres Edifiantes" (see Kath. Missionen, 1904–05).

References

Attribution
 This entry cites:
SOMMERVOGEL, Bibl. de la Comp. de Jésus, s. v. Gobien; 
DE GUILHERMY, Ménologe de la Comp. de Jésus, I (Paris, 1892), 324; 
Nouv. biogr. gén., XXX (Paris, 1883), 403; 
FELLER, Dict. hist., IV, 82.

Works

* Charles Le Comte Louis Le Gobien, Histoire De L'edit De L'empereur De La Chine, En Faveur De La Religion Chrestienne: Avec Un Eclaircissement Sur Les Honneurs Que Les Chinois Rendent À Confucius & Aux Morts (A Paris: Chez Jean Anisson, Directeur de l'Imprimerie royale ...1698). Google Books

* Lettres édifiantes et curieuses, écrites des missions étrangères. [Collected by Charles le Gobien, J.-B. Du Halde, N. Maréchal, Louis Patouillet, Yves Mathurin Marie Tréandet de Querbeuf.] (Paris: N. Leclerc 1707–1776; new edition 1780) Links to digitized versions at Biblioteca Sinica 2.0 (Vienna). WorldCat listing Lettres édifiantes et curieuses.

1653 births
1708 deaths
17th-century French Jesuits
Jesuit missionaries in China
Roman Catholic missionaries in China
18th-century French Jesuits
French sinologists
French Roman Catholic missionaries
Jesuit missionaries
French expatriates in China